Tariq Marquese Carpenter (born December 28, 1998) is an American football strong safety for the Green Bay Packers of the National Football League (NFL). He played college football at Georgia Tech.

Professional career

Carpenter was drafted by the Green Bay Packers in the seventh round (228th overall) of the 2022 NFL Draft. On May 6, 2022, he signed his rookie contract.

NFL career statistics

Regular season

References

External links
Green Bay Packers bio
Georgia Tech Yellow Jackets bio

1998 births
Living people
People from Long County, Georgia
Players of American football from Georgia (U.S. state)
American football safeties
Georgia Tech Yellow Jackets football players
Green Bay Packers players
American football linebackers